Shuliavska is a station on Kyiv Metro's Sviatoshynsko-Brovarska Line. The station was opened on 5 November 1963, and is named after Kyiv's Shuliavka neighbourhood. It was designed by A.V. Dobrovolskyi, B.I. Pryimak, A.I. Malynovskyi, and A.I. Cherkasskyi. The station was formerly known as the Zavod Bolshevik station.

The station has been laid deep underground due to problems with water isolation during its construction. It consists of a central hall with rows of columns near the platforms. The columns are covered with glazed tiles, consisting of rows of different coloured tiles. The entrance to the station is located on the corner of the Prospekt Peremohy (Victory Avenue) and the Dovzhenko Street.

External links
 Kyivsky Metropoliten — Station description and photographs 
 Metropoliten.kiev.ua — Station description and photographs 
 mirmetro.net - photos and description.

Kyiv Metro stations
Railway stations opened in 1963
1963 establishments in Ukraine